Adam Brown (February 4, 1920 — August 9, 1960) was a Canadian ice hockey forward.

Career 
Brown started his National Hockey League career with the Detroit Red Wings in 1941-42. He won the Stanley Cup with the Wings the following year. On October 28, 1945, Brown became the first player in Detroit history to score a hat trick in an opening night home game. His three goals helped Detroit defeat the Boston Bruins 7–0.

On October 16, 1946, Brown was in the starting lineup for the Wings along with Sid Abel and 18-year-old rookie Gordie Howe, who was appearing in his first NHL game. In the second period, Abel and Brown assisted on a goal by Howe, Howe's first goal in the NHL.

Brown also played with the Chicago Black Hawks and the Boston Bruins. He left the NHL after the 1951–52 season.

Personal life 
Brown died in a car accident on August 9, 1960. His son Andy also played in the National Hockey League, as a goaltender.

Career statistics

Regular season and playoffs

See also
List of National Hockey League players born in the United Kingdom

References

External links 

1920 births
1960 deaths
Boston Bruins players
Canadian ice hockey left wingers
Chicago Blackhawks players
Detroit Red Wings players
Hershey Bears players
Indianapolis Capitals players
Kansas City Pla-Mors players
Omaha Knights (AHA) players
Quebec Aces (QSHL) players
St. Louis Flyers players
Scottish emigrants to Canada
Stanley Cup champions
Canadian expatriate ice hockey players in the United States
Road incident deaths